Wettinia aequatorialis is a species of flowering plant in the family Arecaceae. It is commonly found in the country of Ecuador; more specifically the southern part. Its natural habitat is subtropical or tropical moist montane forests. This species is threatened by habitat loss.

References

aequatorialis
Endemic flora of Ecuador
Vulnerable flora of South America
Taxonomy articles created by Polbot